Cherepanovsky District is an administrative and municipal district (raion), one of the thirty in Novosibirsk Oblast, Russia. It is located in the southeast of the oblast. Its administrative center is the town of Cherepanovo. Population: 47,842 (2010 Census);  The population of Cherepanovo accounts for 41.4% of the district's total population.

References

Notes

Sources

Districts of Novosibirsk Oblast